Robert Cregan (born 4 November 1988 in Dublin, Ireland) is an Irish racing driver. He competed in the 2012 GP3 Series season for Ocean Racing Technology. He finished second in the 2010-11 UAE GT Championship - GTC. He is the son of Richard Cregan, who was the team manager of the Toyota Formula One team.

Career
Cregan's racing career began in 2002. He raced in the 2006 Formula Ford 1600 Walter Hayes Trophy, finishing twelfth.

He moved into sportscars in 2008, competing in two races in the 2008 Porsche Supercup season. Cregan finished second in the 2010-11 UAE GT Championship - GTC, winning three of the six races he competed in.

He joined the Fujitsu V8 Supercar Series in 2011, in the process becoming the first Irishman to compete in the series. He competed for Matt Stone Racing in a Ford Falcon (BF) and scored 747 points from the 17 races.

Cregan returned to single-seater racing in 2012 when he competed for Ocean Racing Technology in the 2012 GP3 Series season. He failed to score a point and finished in 22nd in the Drivers' Championship standings.

Racing record

Career summary

Complete GP3 Series results
(key) (Races in bold indicate pole position) (Races in italics indicate fastest lap)

References

External links
 
 

1988 births
Living people
Sportspeople from Dublin (city)
Irish racing drivers
Porsche Supercup drivers
GP3 Series drivers
Ocean Racing Technology drivers
Matt Stone Racing drivers
Trident Racing drivers